César Augusto Fawcett Lébolo  (born August 12, 1983) is a Former Colombian football left defender’’’

International career
He played with the Colombia national under-20 football team at the 2003 FIFA World Youth Championship in UAE, helping Colombia finish 3rd by defeating Argentina.

External links
 BDFA profile 
 

1983 births
Living people
Colombian footballers
Colombia under-20 international footballers
Atlético Junior footballers
Real Cartagena footballers
Independiente Santa Fe footballers
Deportivo Pereira footballers
Categoría Primera A players
Footballers from Barranquilla
Association football defenders
21st-century Colombian people